Otto and Ottomobile were brass era automobile marques of the Otto Gas Engine Works of Philadelphia, Pennsylvania from 1910 to 1912.

History 
The Otto Gas Engine Works was established by Gas-motoren-Fabrik Deutz  as a subsidiary to market the Otto engine in the United States.  Based in Philadelphia, Otto Gas Engine experimented with gasoline vehicles resulting in the Otto Tractor in 1896.  The primary business was stationary gas engines until 1910 when Otto Gas Engine introduced an automobile equipped with an Otto engine.

The Otto Motor Car Sales Company was set up to market an automobile with a four-cylinder  Otto engine on a wheelbase of 123 inches, with Roadster, Demi-Tonneau or Touring body styles.  The Otto car was rated at 35-hp and was premium priced at $2,000, .

The Limousine was priced at $3,250, . For 1912 the cars were called Ottomobile and Otto Gas Engine decided to expand the factory, styles and open up sales to other automobile dealers. Instead, by late 1912 Otto Gas Engine decided to leave automobile manufacturing.

The Otto Gas Engine branch in France built automobiles from 1900 to 1914.  The Otto Gas Engine company in Germany built cars in 1923 and 1924.  Leading up to the First World War, Otto Gas Engine Works was required to sever its connection with its German parent company in 1915 and became a branch of Superior Gas Engine Company.

See also 
 1910 Otto Roadster at ConceptCarz
 FarmCollector article - The Ottomobile and Case automobiles
 Gas Engine Magazine article on the 1896 Otto Tractor
 Vintage Machinery - Otto Gas Engine Works

References

Defunct motor vehicle manufacturers of the United States
Brass Era vehicles
1910s cars
Motor vehicle manufacturers based in Pennsylvania
Motor vehicle engine manufacturers
Cars introduced in 1910
Vehicle manufacturing companies established in 1910
Vehicle manufacturing companies disestablished in 1912